José Clemente Maurer, C.Ss.R. (13 March 1900—27 June 1990) was a German Cardinal of the Roman Catholic Church. He served as Archbishop of Sucre from 1951 to 1983, and was elevated to the cardinalate in 1967.

Biography
José Maurer was born in Püttlingen, and entered the Congregation of the Most Holy Redeemer, more commonly known as the Redemptorists, on 10 September 1921. After studying in Switzerland and Luxembourg, he was ordained to the priesthood on 19 September 1925. He then did missionary work with the Bolivian Indians, serving as superior of the Redemptorist residence in La Paz from 1926 to 1947, when he became vice-provincial of his congregation for South America.

On 1 March 1950 Maurer was appointed Auxiliary Bishop of La Paz and Titular Bishop of Cea by Pope Pius XII. He received his episcopal consecration on the following April 16 from Cardinal Adeodato Giovanni Piazza, OCD, with Archbishop Francesco Beretti and Bishop Augusto Sieffert, CSSR, serving as co-consecrators. Maurer was later promoted to Archbishop of Sucre on 27 October 1951 and attended the Second Vatican Council from 1962 to 1965.

Pope Paul VI created him Cardinal Priest of Ss. Redentore e S. Alfonso in Via Merulana in the consistory of 26 June 1967; Maurer was the first cardinal from Bolivia. He was one of the cardinal electors who participated in the conclaves of August and October 1978, which selected Popes John Paul I and John Paul II respectively. Maurer resigned his post as Archbishop on 30 November 1983 after twenty-nine years of service.

The Cardinal died in Sucre, at age 90. He is buried in the metropolitan cathedral.

External links and additional sources
 (for Chronology of Bishops) 
 (for Chronology of Bishops) 
Catholic-Hierarchy 
Cardinals of the Holy Roman Church

1900 births
1990 deaths
People from Püttlingen
20th-century German cardinals
Redemptorist cardinals
Bolivian cardinals
Bolivian Roman Catholic archbishops
Participants in the Second Vatican Council
Grand Crosses with Star and Sash of the Order of Merit of the Federal Republic of Germany
Recipients of the Saarland Order of Merit
Cardinals created by Pope Paul VI
Roman Catholic archbishops of Sucre
Roman Catholic bishops of La Paz